Elguja Lobjanidze (born 17 September 1992) is a Georgian football player who is playing for Chinese Super League club Meizhou Hakka.

Club career
Lobjanidze made his debut in the Russian Premier League for FC Orenburg on 4 March 2017 in a game against FC Arsenal Tula.

On 13 January 2020, Lobjanidze was announced as a new signing for Kazakhstan Premier League club FC Kaisar.

On 18 February 2021, Lobjanidze was announced as a new signing for Kazakhstan Premier League club FC Tobol.

In February 2023, Lobjanidze joined Chinese Super League club Meizhou Hakka.

Career statistics

Club

International

Statistics accurate as of match played 18 November 2020

References

External links
 
 

1992 births
Footballers from Tbilisi
Living people
Georgia (country) international footballers
Expatriate footballers from Georgia (country)
Footballers from Georgia (country)
FC WIT Georgia players
FC Shukura Kobuleti players
FC Dinamo Batumi players
FC Orenburg players
FC Metalurgi Rustavi players
FC Taraz players
FC Kaisar players
FC Tobol players
FC Kyzylzhar players
Meizhou Hakka F.C. players
Russian Premier League players
Erovnuli Liga players
Kazakhstan Premier League players
Chinese Super League players
Association football forwards
Expatriate footballers in Russia
Expatriate footballers in Kazakhstan
Expatriate footballers in China